An Inspection, Maintenance and Repair (IMR) vessel is a highly technical vessel, deployed in the offshore industry.
Their primary task comprises the inspection and repair of subsea facilities and installations. These vessels are often equipped for other tasks including diving support, scale treatment and light construction work.

Capabilities 

IMR vessels are designed to continue operations in harsh weather conditions. They are equipped with IMO Class II or Class III Dynamic Positioning Systems and have the latest technology on board. The vessels usually have a large deck area, used for the carriage of auxiliary equipment, spools, containers, etc. The accommodation provides capacity for between 80 and 100 people. The vessels often have a helicopter platform. Most vessels have 1 or 2 cranes for supplies and installation of small-size structures. All vessels have a moon pool installed for the support of ROVs. Many IMR vessels have tanks for the supply of potable fresh water, brine and lubrication oil to the installation and the removal of greywater and sewage from it.

Operations 

These multi-purpose vessels' work includes:

 support for one or more ROVs
 survey and maintenance of pipelines
 support for diving
 structural inspections
 scale treatment
 support for laying cables and hoses
 bolt inspection and replacement
 support for drilling
 light construction work
 support for the maintenance of offshore installations
 well stimulation

Design 

Modern IMR vessels concentrate on a bigger operational window, being able to operate in the harshest of weather conditions, including the arctic environment. Many new vessels have an ice class notation and carry winterization equipment. New vessels are designed to be more environmental friendly and energy efficient by reducing emissions, using less or alternative fuel (LNG) and noise reduction. Designers and operators focus on a comfortable environment for crewmembers. IMR vessels often have a gymnasium, a solarium, a movie theatre and a high-quality kitchen.

References

http://www.norskoljeoggass.no/Global/2013%20Dokumenter/HMS%20og%20drift/Seminarer%20ol/Subsea%20annual%20conference%202013/NOoG%20IMR%20presentasjon%2013-03-2013.pdf
http://www.bourbon-online.com/en/subsea-services/subsea-inspection-maintenance-and-repair-imr

Service vessels